The 2019 Cyprus Cup was the twelfth edition of the Cyprus Cup, an invitational women's football tournament held annually in Cyprus. It took from 27 February to 6 March 2019.

North Korea won their first title after a final win over Italy.

Format
The twelve invited teams were split into three groups to play a round-robin tournament.

Points awarded in the group stage follow the standard formula of three points for a win, one point for a draw and zero points for a loss. In the case of two teams being tied on the same number of points in a group, their head-to-head result determine the higher place.

Venues

Teams

Squads

Group stage

Group A

Group B

Group C

Ranking of teams for placement matches
The ranking of the 1st, 2nd, and 3rd placed teams in each group to determine the placement matches:

1st placed teams

2nd placed teams

3rd placed teams

4th placed teams

Final stage

Eleventh place game

Ninth place game

Seventh place game

Fifth place game

Third place game

Final

Final standings

Goalscorers

References

External links
Official website

2019
2019 in women's association football
2018–19 in Cypriot football
Cyprus Women's Cup
Cyprus Women's Cup